The 2009 Berlin Marathon was the 36th edition of the Berlin Marathon. The marathon took place in Berlin, Germany, on 20 September 2009 and was the fourth World Marathon Majors race of the year.

The men's race was won by Haile Gebrselassie in 2:06:08 hours and the women's race was won by Atsede Habtamu in a time of 2:24:47 hours.

Results

Men

Women

References

External links

36st Berlin Marathon

Berlin Marathon
Berlin Marathon
2009 in Berlin
Berlin Marathon